Aharon of Zhitomir was a disciple of Dov Ber of Mezeritch and a representative of the sect of the Ḥasidim: born about 1750; died about 1820. He wrote Kabbalistic homilies on the Pentateuch under the title "Toledot Aharon" (The Generations of Aaron), Berditchev, 1817.

References

External links
Toldot Aharon by Rabbi Aharon of Zhitomir (first edition)

1750s births
1820s deaths
Year of birth uncertain
Year of death uncertain

Ukrainian Hasidic rabbis
Hasidic rebbes